The 2019 Ipswich Borough Council elections for the Ipswich Borough Council took place on 2 May: 16 seats were contested - one in each of the 16 wards and also on 26 September when a by-election took place where 1 seat was contested (Alexandra Ward).

Results summary

Ward Results
These are the results for all 16 wards.

Alexandra

Bixley

Bridge

Castle Hill

Gainsborough

Gipping

Holywells

Priory Heath

Rushmere

Sprites

1,468

St John's

St Margaret's

Stoke Park

Westgate

Whitehouse

Whitton

By-Elections

Alexandra By-Election

References

2019 English local elections
Ipswich Borough Council elections
May 2019 events in the United Kingdom
2010s in Suffolk